Steam is the fourth studio album by Americancountry music artist Ty Herndon. It features the singles "Steam", "No Mercy", and "A Love Like That", all of which entered the Billboard country music charts; "You Can Leave Your Hat On" also entered the charts from unsolicited airplay. This album was less successful than its predecessors as far as the peak positions of its chart singles. The highest-peaking, which was the title track, reached number 18, while "No Mercy" peaked at number 26. "A Love Like That" peaked at number 58, becoming the second single of Herndon's career to miss the Top 40.

Track listing

Personnel
Compiled from liner notes.

Musicians
 Eric Darken - percussion
 Dan Dugmore - steel guitar, Dobro
 Glen Duncan - fiddle, mandolin
 Ty Herndon - lead vocals
 John Hobbs - piano, organ, synthesizer
 Paul Leim - drums, percussion
 Chris Leuzinger - electric guitar
 Gary Lunn - bass guitar
 Steve Nathan - synthesizer
 Brent Rowan - electric guitar
 Biff Watson - acoustic guitar

Backing vocalists
 Robert Bailey
 Joe Chemay
 Lisa Cochran
 Tabitha Fair
 Kim Fleming
 Vicki Hampton
 Anthony Martin
 Neil Thrasher
 Chris Willis

Additional musicians on "You Can Leave Your Hat On"
 Mike Haynes - trumpet
 Jim Horn - saxophone
 Kirk "Jelly Roll" Johnson - harmonica
 Chris McDonald - trombone

String section on "Pray for Me"
 Carl Gorodetzky
 Jim Grosjean
 Bob Mason
 Pamela Sixfin

Technical
 Tommy Cooper - string arrangements on "Pray for Me"
 Jim Cotton - engineering
 Chris Davie - engineering
 Greg Fogie - engineering
 Steve Marcantonio - recording, mixing
 Melissa Mattey - engineering
 J. C. Monterosa - engineering
 Joe Scaife - production
 Hank Williams - mastering

Chart performance

References

1999 albums
Epic Records albums
Ty Herndon albums